Coptobasoides djadjoualis is a moth in the family Crambidae. It was described by Viette in 1981. It is found on the Comoros.

References

Moths described in 1981
Pyraustinae